Universidad de la Tercera Edad (UTE) is a university in Santo Domingo in the Dominican Republic.

Universities in the Dominican Republic
Education in Santo Domingo